Tierarzt Dr. Engel is a German television series.

See also
List of German television series

External links
 

1998 German television series debuts
2004 German television series endings
Television shows set in Bavaria
German-language television shows
ZDF original programming